Roman François Coppola (born April 22, 1965) is an American director, screenwriter, producer. He is the son of Francis Ford Coppola and Eleanor Coppola. 

Coppola serves as president of the San Francisco-based film company American Zoetrope. He is also the founder and owner of The Directors Bureau, a commercial and music video production company.

Early life
Roman Coppola is the son of documentary filmmaker, artist, and writer Eleanor Coppola (née Neil) and director Francis Ford Coppola.

Career
Coppola began his directing career by overseeing in-camera visual effects and second unit direction for Francis Ford Coppola's  Bram Stoker’s Dracula, which garnered a BAFTA Award nomination for Visual Effects. He has continued to do second unit direction throughout his career, including his father's Jack, The Rainmaker, Youth Without Youth, and Tetro; collaborator Wes Anderson's The Life Aquatic with Steve Zissou and The Darjeeling Limited; and his sister Sofia Coppola's The Virgin Suicides and Marie Antoinette.

In the 1990s, Coppola established himself as an influential music video and commercial director. Through his production company, The Directors Bureau, he directed all four music videos for The Strokes' 2001 debut album, Is This It, as well as "12:51" for Room on Fire. His other music videos include clips for Daft Punk, Lilys, Moby, The Presidents of the United States of America, Ween, Green Day, and Fatboy Slim. His music video for Phoenix's "Funky Squaredance" was invited into the permanent collection at the New York Museum of Modern Art. He has also been a supporter of cousin Jason Schwartzman's musical side project, Coconut Records.

He also directed a commercial for Levi's White Tab in 1997.

His first feature film, CQ, premiered at the 2001 Cannes Film Festival and was well-received critically. Set in Paris in 1969, CQ centers on a young film editor trying to juggle his personal and professional life while simultaneously juggling a science fiction adventure and his own personal art film. The film holds a 66% rating on Rotten Tomatoes, based on 76 reviews. The site's consensus reads: "CQ is a stylish and fun homage to campy 1960s flicks". Metacritic gave the film a 56/100 "mixed or average" approval rating based on 26 reviews.

Coppola's second feature, A Glimpse Inside the Mind of Charles Swan III, debuted in 2012 at the Rome Film Festival. Charlie Sheen starred as the title character, a graphic designer dealing with a break-up. The cast also included Bill Murray and Jason Schwartzman. Reviews for the film tended toward the negative. Nathan Rabin of The A.V. Club gave the movie an F, saying that "it isn't a movie so much as a feature-length perfume commercial for a Charlie Sheen signature cologne with gorgeous packaging and absolutely nothing inside." The Dallas Observer said that the film "might generously be described as cut-and-paste – or more accurately as 'throw stuff to the wall and see what sticks'" and it was "a clunker". The New York Daily News gave Charles Swan III one star out of five, saying that "you want to swat it away" and that "maybe with this out of his [Coppola's] system, he'll think up something better." Time said that the film "does not lead to a deeper understanding of Charlie Sheen. It does, however, demonstrate his compulsion for poor judgment and bad choices. But weren't we already convinced of that?" Lisa Schwarzbaum, reviewer for Entertainment Weekly, gave the film a C and a milder response, writing, "The idea of this home-movie-with-higher-production-values directed by Roman Coppola is no less sweet for being unoriginal ... The execution, on the other hand, is perilously self-absorbed, a private party involving friends, family, too many fantasy sequences, and an abundance of costume and set design to create a notion of a stylized L.A. spritzed with eau de Playboy."

In 2009, he directed series of commercials for the T-Mobile MyTouch 3G mobile phone line.

In 2015, he directed a State Farm commercial.

In 2018, he co-wrote the story for Wes Anderson's adult stop-motion animated science-fiction drama film  Isle of Dogs, which was released to critical acclaim for its animation, story, musical score, and deadpan humor. Richard Roeper of the Chicago Sun-Times gave the film three and a half stars out of four, praising it for taking risks, and saying: "It's smart and different and sometimes deliberately odd and really funny—rarely in a laugh-out-loud way, more in a smile-and-nod-I-get-the-joke kind of way."

In 2021, he again collaborated with Wes Anderson for the film The French Dispatch, he co-wrote the story and served as an executive producer. It received generally positive reviews. David Rooney of The Hollywood Reporter praised the "hand-crafted visual delights and eccentric performances" and wrote: "While The French Dispatch might seem like an anthology of vignettes without a strong overarching theme, every moment is graced by Anderson's love for the written word and the oddball characters who dedicate their professional lives to it". Writing for The Guardian, Peter Bradshaw said: "It might not be at the very zenith of what he can achieve but for sheer moment-by-moment pleasure, and for laughs, this is a treat". It was mentioned in lists of the best films of the year by The New Yorker (#1), The Forward (the best movie), IndieWire (#6), Esquire (#38), New Musical Express (#11), British Film Institute (#23) and Vogue (unlisted).

Directors Bureau special projects
Coppola is also an inventor and entrepreneur, responsible for the Photobubble Company, Pacific Tote Company, and a number of projects through the "Special Projects" arm of his production company, Directors Bureau.

His company, Pacific Tote Company, produces a line of beach bags which are handmade in California and known for their signature multicolor designs.

Filmography

Feature films

Additional directing credits

Acting credits

Television

Short films

Music videos

Commercials and promotional videos

Awards and honors
In 2019, Coppola was invited to join the Academy of Motion Picture Arts and Sciences.

References

External links
 Roman Coppola Studio
 The Directors Bureau
 The Directors Bureau Special Projects
 
 
 The Darjeeling Limited Interview with Roman Coppola

1965 births
American people of Italian descent
American music video directors
Roman
Living people
Tisch School of the Arts alumni
People from Neuilly-sur-Seine
American male screenwriters
Advertising directors